The Koolatong River is a river in the Northern Territory, Australia.

Rising in the Mitchell Ranges the river initially flows north then turns east across the uninhabited plains eventually discharging into the Saint Nicholas Inlet and the Blue Mud Bay then into the Gulf of Carpentaria.

The estuary formed at the river mouth is in near pristine condition. It is river dominated in nature with a tide dominated delta having a single channel and is surrounded by an area of  covered with mangroves.

The traditional owners of the area are the Murngin also known as the Yolngu peoples.

See also

List of rivers of Northern Territory

References

Rivers of the Northern Territory
Arnhem Land
Gulf of Carpentaria